Life, the universe and everything may refer to:
A phrase from The Hitchhiker's Guide to the Galaxy by Douglas Adams
 Life, the Universe and Everything, the third book in the Hitchhiker's Guide to the Galaxy series
Life, the Universe, & Everything, an annual academic science fiction symposium held in the USA

See also
Life
Universe
Everything
42 (number)